Obatoclax mesylate, also known as GX15-070, is an experimental drug for the treatment of various types of cancer.  It was discovered by Gemin X, which was acquired by Cephalon, which has since been acquired by Teva Pharmaceuticals.  Several Phase II clinical trials were completed that investigated use of Obatoclax in the treatment of leukemia, lymphoma, myelofibrosis, and mastocytosis.

Mechanism of action

Obatoclax is an inhibitor of the Bcl-2 family of proteins.  This inhibition induces apoptosis in cancer cells, preventing tumor growth. Solubility has been an issue in the development of the drug.

Clinical trials 
Clinical trial results have been published for treatment of acute myeloid leukemia, small cell lung cancer, Hodgkin's lymphoma, myelodysplastic syndromes,

Teva halted a phase III trial in patients with lung cancer before it had begun, citing "business decisions" as the reason.

See also 
 Navitoclax

References

Experimental cancer drugs
Indoles
Pyrroles